Elif Deniz (born 25 March 1993) is a Turkish women's football midfielder, who last y played in the First League for Trabzon İdmanocağı with jersey number 11. She is a member of the Turkish national team since 2010.

Career

Club
She received her license on 5 May 2006 for her hometown club Kdz. Ereğlispor, where she played until October 2012. In the 2012–13 season, Elif Deniz transferred to Trabzon İdmanocağı.

International
Elif Deniz was called for the Turkey girls' U-17 national team, and debuted in the 2009 UEFA Women's U-17 Championship qualifying round match against the Irish girls on 18 October 2008. She participated also at the 2010 UEFA Women's U-17 Championship qualifying round matches, and capped 11 times in total for the youth nationals.

She appeared for the first time in the Turkey women's U-19 team in the match against Icelandic juniors at the 2011 UEFA Women's U-19 Championship Second qualifying round on 31 March 2011. Elif Deniz participated also at the 2012 UEFA Women's U-19 Championship – Final tournament matches. She capped 23 times in total and scored one goal for the junior women's team.

She made her first appearance in the women's national team on 3 February 2010 playing in a friendly match against the Russian team. She participated in the qualifying round matches of UEFA Women's Euro 2013 qualifying – Group 2 and 2015 FIFA Women's World Cup qualification – UEFA Group 6. As of 19 June 2014 she capped 7 times in the national team.

Career statistics
.

Honours
Turkish Women's First League
 Kdz. Ereğlispor
 Third places (1): 2011–12

 Trabzon İdmanocağı
 Third places (1): 2014–15, 2015–16

References

External links
 

Living people
1993 births
People from Karadeniz Ereğli
Turkish women's footballers
Women's association football midfielders
Turkey women's international footballers
Trabzon İdmanocağı women's players
Karadeniz Ereğlispor players